"Nefsy Tefhimny" ("I Wish You Could Understand Me") is an Amal Hijazi single released in mid-2007. The song was specially written for Hijazi by the famed Ramy Youssef.

The song was somewhat a mixture of Khaleeji dialects and music with Western beats, which made it famous among audience. It was sung in the Khaleeji accent and is considered to be one of her greatest success since the release of her album Zaman. "Nefsy Tefhimny" was a hit throughout the Middle East topping charts from Lebanon to Syria to the Persian Gulf region. Fans consider it to be Hijazi's greatest hit ever since "Zaman" and "Romancia". One of the most broadcast songs of 2007, the single also spawned an equally popular music video.

The video of the song gained immense popularity, being directed by the famed Tony Kahwaji.  Hijazi appeared with yet another different look, wearing an extremely short skirt, a white blouse and black coat and gloves, a style similar to an air hostess.

Fans also noted that Hijazi had never looked so seductive in any of her previous music videos, not even in "Baya al Ward"  or "Einak" her duet with Faudel.

"Nefsy Tefhimny" topped charts all around the Middle East. It debuted at #2 on the official Pepsi Top 10 charts on Rotana but later moved on to #1, ahead of the musical giant Latifa. Hijazi's new single brought her immense fame, especially in Arab states of the Persian Gulf, where she was admired because of her vocal abilities to sing in so many diverse accents. Previously, Hijazi had sung in both Lebanese and Egyptian dialects and even done a famous, French-dialect song on her second album Zaman.

In addition, the music video for the song received massive airplay on the Rotana music channels.

References
Amal Hijazi Fans
Info on Nefsy Tefhimny

2007 singles
Amal Hijazi songs
2007 songs